The Krio people (also referred to as Dayak Krio, Dayak Uheng Kereho, Punan Keriau, Dayak Seputan, Oloh Ot Nyawong or Penyahbong) are a Dayak ethnic group in West Kalimantan, Indonesia. They live on the upper course of the Krio River and speak the Krio Dayak language.

History
The Ulu Aik Kingdom was established, by the upper course of the Krio River, around 1700 by Pancur Sembore and Tanjung Porikng. The first leader was pang ukir Empu Geremeng, who was succeeded by Bikukng Tiung.  Under Bihukng's leadership, the kingdom was renamed Ulu Aik.

Traditional Krio song
 Pupu' Tagua
 Marau
 Jai Ca' Sampe

Religion
Duwata is the god of the Krio Dayak and the Jelai Dayak.

References

External links
Raja Singa Bangs: Dayak Monarch without Power or Wealth by Edi Petebang, published in The Jakarta Post October 7, 1998. Mentions the Krio River and Krio Dayak.
Traditional Dayak Krio Weddings

Ethnic groups in Indonesia
Dayak people